Mount Darwin West is a constituency represented in the National Assembly of the Parliament of Zimbabwe. Its current MP since 2015 is Bannwell Seremwe of ZANU–PF.

Members

Election results

2008 
In the 2008 parliamentary election, Vice-President Joyce Mujuru was the ZANU-PF candidate. She faced two Movement for Democratic Change (MDC) candidates, Gora Madzudzo from the MDC-T, the formation supporting  Morgan Tsvangirai, and Shanya Joseph from the MDC-M, the one supporting Arthur Mutambara.

Both official results released by the Zimbabwe Electoral Commission and those announced by independent/opposition groups indicated that Mujuru won with a large majority.

The following results are the official results.

References

External links
https://web.archive.org/web/20080303001109/http://www.newzimbabwe.com/pages/electoral159.17766.html
https://web.archive.org/web/20080404060118/http://www.sokwanele.com/election2008/constituency

Mashonaland Central Province
Parliamentary constituencies in Zimbabwe
Politics of Zimbabwe